Norwich Zen Buddhist Priory is a place of meditation and practice for the Sōtō Zen tradition of Buddhism. It is located in west Norwich, England. A senior monk in the Order of Buddhist Contemplatives, Reverend Leoma Hague, is resident there.

Norwich Zen Buddhist Priory was established in 2013. It offers teaching and guidance, either in person or online, on meditation and Buddhist life. There is a schedule of regular meetings, retreats, festivals and other events for anyone who wishes to learn about or deepen their practice of meditation.

The priory is supported by a group of lay Buddhists in Norwich and across East Anglia who follow the Sōtō Zen tradition. It is dependent entirely on donations.

References

External links 

 Norwich Zen Buddhist Priory official website

Zen centers
Buddhist temples in England
Soto Zen